Boyevoy was a  of the Soviet and later Russian navy.

Development and design 

The project began in the late 1960s when it was becoming obvious in the Soviet Navy that naval guns still had an important role particularly in support of amphibious landings, but existing gun cruisers and destroyers were showing their age. A new design was started, employing a new  automatic gun turret.

Construction and career 
Boyevoy was laid down on 26 March 1982 and launched on 4 August 1984 by Zhdanov Shipyard in Leningrad. She was commissioned on 5 November 1986.

On 28 November 1987 in the Indian Ocean, she met with a detachment of warships. From 29 November to 3 December, under the flag of Rear Admiral V.I. Darnopykh, she paid a visit to Bombay, India and then on 11 December passed through the Malacca Strait. From 14 to 16 December she entered the naval base at Cam Ranh, Vietnam and on the evening of 22 December, together with the destroyers  and  arrived in Vladivostok. From 12 to 16 May 1988, together with the icebreaker  and Admiral Zakharov under the flag of Admiral G.А. Khvatova, paid a visit to the port of Wonsan, North Korea. In the port of Wonsan, Boyevoy was visited by the commander of the North Korean Navy.

From 4 April 1989, she carried out combat service in the Persian Gulf, performing reconnaissance and escorting tasks. From 14 to 18 August, she was in Madras, India and later in the South China Sea she carried out tracking of a multi-purpose aircraft carrier group of the United States Navy. In a storm, she saved 50 Vietnamese from the junks and brought them to Cam Ranh. On 23 September she returned to Vladivostok. From April to September she had covered . The ship's combat service was excellent. At the end of 1989, the ship received the Navy Main Committee Prize for artillery fire and took first place among the surface ships of the Pacific Fleet, declared the best ship in preparation for protection against weapons of mass destruction, the crew was awarded the Challenging Red Banner of the Pacific Fleet Military Council.

On 12 July 1990, as part of a detachment of warships, she went out to sea, on 16–18 July she entered Petropavlovsk-Kamchatsky, from 31 July to 4 August, together with the destroyer  and the tanker  under the flag of Admiral G. Khvatov, made a goodwill visit to the naval base of San Diego, United States. During the visit, 49,000 Americans visited the ships. On 18 August 1990, she entered Petropavlovsk-Kamchatsky, on 22 August, arrived in Vladivostok. During the cruise, she covered  with five underway replenishments. In the year 1991, the ship traveled . From 15 October 1992 to 30 August 1993, repairs were carried out at SRZ No. 178. 

In 1994, she won first place in the Navy in missile training. Docking took place in October-December 1994. In August 1995, as part of the ship's strike group with the destroyer , she won the Navy Commander's Prize for missile training and the prize for the search for submarines. In 1996, with faulty boilers, she went out to sea as part of a ship's strike group, winning the Navy Commander's Prize for missile training. 

Since 1998, the vessel has been withdrawn to the reserve due to lack of funds to replace pipes in the main boilers. In June 2020, during the disposal, she sank, polluting the water area, a month later the ship was raised.

References 

1984 ships
Ships built at Severnaya Verf
Cold War destroyers of the Soviet Union
Sovremenny-class destroyers